Andronyk Ioanykiyovych Dudka-Stepovych (Andronik Ioannikievich Dudka-Stepovich) was a historian of Slavic studies, literary theorist specializing in the history of literature and translator of various Slavic works.

Stepovych was a contributing editor of the Kievan historical magazine Kievskaya starina. He also was editing articles for the Brockhaus and Efron Encyclopedic Dictionary.

Bibliography
 «Очерк истории чешской литературы» (Outline of history of Czech literature), 1886
 «Очерки из истории славянских литератур» (Essays on history of Slavic literatures), 1893
 «Очерки истории сербохорватской литературы» (Outline of history of Serbo-Croatian literature), 1899

References

External links
 Yas, O.V. Andronik Stepovych. Encyclopedia of history of Ukraine.
 Andronik Stepovych. Ukrainians in the World portal.

1857 births
1935 deaths
People from Pryluky
People from Poltava Governorate
19th-century Ukrainian historians
Historians from the Russian Empire
Literary theorists
Slavists
Bohemistics